Landon Branch is a stream in Vernon County in the U.S. state of Missouri.

Landon Branch has the name of the local Landon family.

See also
List of rivers of Missouri

References

Rivers of Vernon County, Missouri
Rivers of Missouri